Scrophularia sambucifolia is a species of flowering plant in the figwort family (Scrophulariaceae) native to the Iberian Peninsula and Northwest Africa.

Description

Flower crown is orange-reddish, orange-purple or greenish-yellow with orange spots, upper lip is reddish purple. Anthers are yellow, sometimes with bluish margins. Staminode is purple, sometimes greenish-purple.

Distribution and habitat
Scrophularia sambucifolia is native to the southwest Iberian Peninsula (in central and southern Portugal, mainly Médio Tejo, Lezíria do Tejo, Baixo Alentejo and Algarve, southwest Spain and Gibraltar) and Northwest Africa (in Morocco, Algeria and Tunisia) where it inhabits moist sites, usually close to the margins of water lines, preferably on deep soils of mud or limestone origin.

Subspecies
There are two known subspecies:

S. sambucifolia subsp. sambucifolia: Endemic to southwest Iberia and Morocco.
S. sambucifolia subsp. mellifera(Aiton): Endemic to southwest Spain, Morocco, Algeria and Tunisia.

References

sambucifolia
Flora of Southwestern Europe
Flora of North Africa
Plants described in 1753